Laurie Marhoefer is a historian of queer and trans politics who is employed as the Jon Bridgman Endowed Professor of History at the University of Washington. In January 2021, together with Jennifer V. Evans, they facilitated the Jack and Anita Hess Research Seminar at the United States Holocaust Memorial Museum on LGBTQ+ histories of the Holocaust.

Works

References

Living people
University of Washington faculty
Historians of Germany
Historians of sexuality
Year of birth missing (living people)